Bibbe Hansen (born January 31, 1952) is an American performance artist, musician and actress.

Family
Hansen's parents were bohemian Jewish poet Audrey Ostlin Hansen and Fluxus artist Al Hansen, a participant in the Andy Warhol Factory. Her stepfather was Jimmy Shapiro. She is the mother of three children, Beck Hansen, Channing Hansen and Rain Whittaker, a musician, artist and poet respectively. Hansen delivered her future daughter-in-law, Marissa Ribisi, and Marissa's twin brother, Giovanni, when they were born. Hansen is grandmother to Beck and Marissa's two children: Cosimo (born 2004) and Tuesday (born 2007) and Channing's son: Aubrey (born 1994).

Acting career
Hansen began her professional acting career as a child with the Saranac Lake Summer Theater in upstate New York. As a teenager in the mid-1960s, Hansen appeared in films by avant-garde filmmaker Jonas Mekas. After a chance meeting with Andy Warhol, he invited her to collaborate on a film about her recent incarceration in various youth penal institutions. The result was Warhol's film Prison, co-starring Edie Sedgwick. She also appeared in Warhol's Restaurant, 10 Beautiful Girls, 10 More Beautiful Girls, and shot two of Warhol's Screen Tests. In the 1970s she appeared as an extra in the Roger Corman film Big Bad Mama, as a dancer in Brian De Palma's Phantom of the Paradise, and in the Odyssey Theater production of Threepenny Opera directed by Ron Sossi. Her most recent acting appearance was in a 1999 short film, The White to Be Angry.

Music
In 1964, Hansen recorded an album on Laurie Records with Jan Kerouac in a band called The Whippets. The Whippets released a single on the Josie label called "Go Go Go With Ringo," which was a poppy tribute to the Beatles. From 1990 through 1995, Hansen operated the Troy Café in Los Angeles with her husband, Sean Carrillo, and performed with singer, drag queen, and performance artist Vaginal Davis. She and Davis went on to form the satirical band Black Fag, named after, and poking fun at, the famous punk band Black Flag.

References

External links
Official website

Web page documenting Hansen's Warhol days

1952 births
Living people
American film actresses
American people of Norwegian descent
American people of Swedish descent
American people of Jewish descent
American women pop singers
Beck
People associated with The Factory